Andrew Marcus Horton (born August 28, 1949) is an associate justice of the Maine Supreme Judicial Court.

Education 

Horton earned a Bachelor of Arts from Harvard University in 1972 and a Juris Doctor from Georgetown University Law Center in 1977.

Legal career 

Horton has over 42 years of experience as an attorney, including 21 years in law practice and 21 years as a judge.

State judicial service 

He was first appointed to the Maine District Court in 1999 by Governor Angus King, then to the Maine Superior Court in January 2007 by Governor John Baldacci.  He was renominated in January 2014 by Governor Paul LePage.

Maine Supreme Judicial Court service 

On January 6, 2020, Governor Janet Mills announced the nomination of Horton to the seat to be vacated by Donald G. Alexander who  retired at the end of January 2020. On January 30, 2020, his nomination was approved by the Judiciary Committee of the Maine Legislature by a 11–0 vote. On February 4, 2020, he was confirmed unanimously by the Maine Senate.

References 

1949 births
Living people
20th-century American lawyers
21st-century American judges
Georgetown University Law Center alumni
Harvard University alumni
Maine lawyers
Maine state court judges
Justices of the Maine Supreme Judicial Court
People from Washington, D.C.